Arthur Frederick Richards, 1st Baron Milverton  (21 February 1885 – 27 October 1978), was a British colonial administrator who over his career served as Governor of North Borneo, Gambia, Fiji, Jamaica, and Nigeria.

Early life and education 
Richards was born in Bristol in 1885, the son of William Richards. He was educated at Clifton College in Bristol, and graduated from Christ Church, Oxford, in 1907 with a BA.

Colonial service 
Richards entered the Malayan Civil Service in 1908. By 1921, he had become the Acting 1st Assistant Colonial Secretary for the Straits Settlements. He served as Acting Under-Secretary of the Federated Malay States in 1926, and became full Under-Secretary from 1927 to 1929. He was the Acting General Advisor in Johore between 1929 and 1920, and from 1930 to 1933 he served as the Governor of Northern Borneo. Following this, he served as Governor of the Gambia from 1933 to 1936.

He served as Governor of Fiji from 1936 to 1938, holding this office concurrently with the position of High Commissioner of the Western Pacific. From 1938 to 1943, he served as Governor of Jamaica. From 1943 to 1948, he served as Governor of Nigeria. He was known in the Colonial Service as 'Old Sinister'. He became the first Colonial Office official to be raised to the peerage while still in office. In 1986, his former private secretary in Nigeria, Richard Peel, published a memoir of Richards, titled Old Sinister: A Memoir of Sir Arthur Richards.

Honours
He was made a CMG in 1933, elevated to KCMG in 1935, and again to GCMG in 1942. In 1947 he was raised to the peerage as Baron Milverton, of Lagos and of Clifton in the City of Bristol. He was also appointed as K.St.J., and was awarded the US Medal of Freedom with Silver Palm.

Family
In 1927, Richards married Noelle Bënda Whitehead (18 December 1904 – 11 September 2010), daughter of Charles Basil Whitehead. He died in October 1978, aged 93, and was succeeded in the Barony by his eldest son Fraser Arthur Richard Richards.

Arms

References

|-

1885 births
1978 deaths
Civil servants from Bristol
Knights Grand Cross of the Order of St Michael and St George
Governors of Fiji
Governors of Jamaica
British Governors and Governors-General of Nigeria
People educated at Clifton College
Governors of the Gambia
High Commissioners for the Western Pacific
Governors of North Borneo
Place of birth missing
Place of death missing
Barons created by George VI